The 1910 Costa Rican general election was held during the presidency of Cleto González Víquez. This was the last time that indirect elections were held in Costa Rica as for the next one in 1913 the direct vote was implemented.  Liberal lawyer Ricardo Jiménez Oreamuno was elected for the first time (he will be re-elected two more times, the only person in Costa Rica's history who has been democratically elected three times). Jiménez was very popular in part because of his struggles against the United Fruit Company's abusive operations in the country. Jiménez was proclaimed candidate in the Teatro Variedades during the first Republican National Convention, Costa Rica's first primary election. Jiménez won easily over the other candidate, former president Rafael Yglesias who ruled an authoritarian, though short-lived, regime.

Results
First grade election

By province

Second grade electors

References

Elections in Costa Rica
1910 elections in Central America
1910 in Costa Rica